EMF are an English alternative rock band from Cinderford, Gloucestershire, who came to prominence at the beginning of the 1990s. During their initial eight-year run, from 1989 to 1997, the band released three studio albums before a hiatus. Their first single, "Unbelievable", reached number 3 on the UK Singles Chart, and was a number 1 hit on the US Billboard Hot 100 chart. Their debut album, Schubert Dip, went to number 3 on the UK Albums Chart.
In April 2022, EMF released their first album of new material in 27 years, Go Go Sapiens.

Band name
The name EMF is an initialism of Epsom Mad Funkers, a name taken from a fan club of the band New Order in 1989.

The song "Head the Ball", which featured on the remix single release of "Lies", featured the repeating lines "electromotive force" and "ecstasy mother fucker". On the reissue of the band's 1991 album Schubert Dip, after the song "Longtime", there is a hidden track titled "EMF". In this, the chorus lyrics start off with "E for Ecstasy, M for my mind's in my feet, F from us to you" and then move on to "E for Ecstasy, M for mother fucker mother fucker, F from us to you".

Biography

Formation (1989)

All the members of the band were relatively well known in the Forest of Dean music scene before forming EMF in Cinderford in October 1989. Keyboard and sampler player Derry Brownson had formed a band called Flowerdrum but left to join bass guitarist Zac Foley, drummer Marc Decloedt , DJ Milf and singer James Atkin as EMF. Ian Dench was the last to join, having already tasted moderate success as guitarist for Apple Mosaic.

The band's music also has been counted as part of Madchester and alternative dance. They toured the UK in 1990 with Stereo MCs, a band that was relatively unknown at that point.

Schubert Dip and Stigma (1990–1992)
In 1990, their debut single "Unbelievable" topped the charts in many countries around the world, reaching number 1 in the U.S. in July 1991. The single featured sampled utterances from comedian Andrew Dice Clay. In 1991, EMF released their debut album Schubert Dip which went to number 3 in the UK. The name was explained by songwriter Ian Dench, as "If ever I'm short of a chord sequence, I nick one from Schubert." Successful singles from the album included "I Believe", "Children", and "Lies". The last was controversial as it included a voice sample of Mark Chapman, John Lennon's murderer. Yoko Ono, Lennon's wife, achieved an injunction, and a modified version was included in future pressings.

In 1992, EMF returned with the Unexplained EP (including a cover version of "Search and Destroy") and later Stigma, their second album. Both of these releases did poorly in the charts. The singles released were "Getting Through", "They're Here", and "It's You".

Also in 1992, EMF appeared on the Red Hot Organization's dance compilation album Red Hot + Dance, contributing "Unbelievable (The Hovering Feet Mix)". The album attempted to raise awareness and money in support of the AIDS epidemic, and all proceeds were donated to AIDS charities.

Cha Cha Cha and first hiatus (1995–2000)
EMF's third album, Cha Cha Cha, was released in 1995 and featured the singles "Perfect Day" and "Bleeding You Dry". In the same year, EMF teamed with comedians Vic Reeves and Bob Mortimer and recorded "I'm a Believer", a cover of The Monkees song. This single reached No. 3 in the UK singles chart.

Following the release of the Afro King single (which failed to do well), the band split up for the first time. However, all members of the band continued to play music. Ian Dench formed the indie rock band Whistler, which was active from 1998 to 2000.  James Atkin formed the big beat trio Cooler and Derry Brownson formed alternative rock trio LK. Zac Foley became the bass player for Carrie.

Reunion and second hiatus (2001–2006)
In 2001, EMF played a reunion gig in London. They also released a greatest hits album: Epsom Mad Funkers: The Best of EMF.

Zac Foley died on 3 January 2002 at the age of 31, due to an overdose of non-prescribed drugs. Following his death, EMF played just four more gigs in late 2002 before splitting again.

Second reunion (2007–2009)
In 2007, the band announced they would be reforming to play a one-off gig at the Scala in King's Cross, London, on 18 December. The place of Foley was taken by Richard March, formerly of Pop Will Eat Itself and Bentley Rhythm Ace.

In 2008, EMF played the Portsmouth Festival on 9 October, and supported Carter USM at Birmingham Academy and London's Brixton Academy in November that year.

In May 2009, EMF announced that due to personal issues, the band would not be doing any more shows in the near future, thus ending their second reunion.

2012 and beyond
In 2012, they reformed to play at the inaugural festival Lakefest in Tewkesbury, alongside Levellers and Dodgy, on 18 and 19 May. The band welcomed new bassist Stevey Marsh during this show. For the first time they performed every track from the album Schubert Dip in order to coincide with the 21st anniversary re-release. The band headlined at the Westbury Festival on 25 August 2012.

In December 2012, the band played 'Schubert Dip' and 'Stigma' from start to finish at the Gloucester Guildhall. The show was recorded and sold as a live Blu-ray/DVD titled "Long Live the New Flesh."

On October 1, 2016, the band headlined Indie Daze in London.

In 2020, the band successfully crowdfunded a career-spanning vinyl boxset titled 'From Us to You.' It contained all the full-length albums remastered, and a 4th vinyl containing unreleased demos and fan favorite non-album tracks.

In February 2022, the band announced an all-new material album, titled Go Go Sapiens that was released 1 April 2022. Its first single, "Sister Sandinista", was released 1 March 2022. They also had a short UK tour in early April 2022.

Members 

 James Atkin (vocals, guitars)
 Ian Dench (guitars, keyboards)
 Stevey Marsh (bass)
 Adrian Todd (drums)
 Derry Brownson (keyboards, samples)

Former members

 Zac Foley (bass), born 9 December 1970, Gloucester; died 2 January 2002
 Jack Stephens (drums)
 Tim Stephens (guitars)
 Phil Cleary (guest vocals)
 Mark Decloedt (drums)
 Richard March (bass)
 Lee Berrecloth (guitarist)

Later work
Since 2010 James Atkin has taught music at Holy Family Catholic School in Keighley, West Yorkshire and is a touring member of Bentley Rhythm Ace. As of June 2020, he has released four solo albums including Popcorn Storm (2019) and A Country Mile (2014).

Discography

Albums

Compilations

EPs

Singles

Videos

References

Citations

Other sources

External links

Musical groups established in 1989
Musical groups disestablished in 2002
English electronic music groups
Madchester groups
English rock music groups
Forest of Dean
Musical groups disestablished in 1997
Musical groups reestablished in 2001
Musical groups reestablished in 2007
Musical groups disestablished in 2009
Musical groups reestablished in 2012
Parlophone artists
Alternative dance musical groups
English alternative rock groups
Dance-rock musical groups